The European Taekwondo Union (ETU) or World Taekwondo Europe (WTE) is the official governing body for all Taekwondo matters in Europe as a regional organisation of World Taekwondo. It comprises the National Taekwondo Federations of all the European member nations and regulates all Taekwondo matters on a continental basis. The first participating countries in the ETU were Spain, Belgium, Austria, Portugal, Germany, Italy, France, Netherlands, Turkey, Greece, Denmark and the UK. The first president was Antonio Garcia de la Fuente. The First European Championships of the ETU were held in Barcelona on May 22–23, 1976. After being considered only a demonstration sports event twice - in Seoul 1988 and Barcelona 1992 - the WTF style (Olympic Style Taekwondo) - was incorporated as a full Olympic discipline in Sydney in 2000. After the 2022 Russian invasion of Ukraine, it was announced that European Taekwondo Union will not recognise taekwondo events organised in Russia and Belarus, and will not host events in either country.

Members of the European Taekwondo Union (WTF Style) uses the Hyung#Poomsae style of teaching Taekwondo.

Main events
European Taekwondo Championships
European Taekwondo Championships in Olympic Weights
European Kids Taekwondo Championships
European Cadets Taekwondo Championships
European Juniors Taekwondo Championships
European U21 Taekwondo Championships
European Masters Taekwondo Championships
Multi European Taekwondo Championships (WTE)
European Clubs Taekwondo Championships
European Poomsae Taekwondo Championships
European Online Poomsae Taekwondo Championships
European Beach Taekwondo Championships
European Universities Taekwondo Championships
President Cup Europe (WT)
European Para Taekwondo Open Championships
European Hanmadang Taekwondo Championships

Open
Polish Taekwondo Open
Russia Taekwondo Open
Spanish Taekwondo Open
Turkey Taekwondo Open

The 5 tenets of ETU (WT style) taekwondo

 Etiquette
 Modesty
 Perseverance
 Self control
 Indomitable Spirit

The ETU (WT style) taekwondo student oath 

 To observe the tenets of Taekwondo
 To have respect for instructors and fellow students
 To never misuse the art of Taekwondo
 To be a champion of freedom and justice
 To help build a more peaceful world

Advancement

Advancing through the belts is done by a system of gradings. Gradings are typically held in 3 month cycles at regional training centres. Grading systems will typically consist of line work, patterns, theory, and sparring. Students can typically advance through the belts at a rate of 1 Kup every 3 months. Although it is possible for students who perform exceptionally well during their grading to 'double promote', this means that they gain 2 Kup instead of one. this is however not very common and is only done if the student has exhibited complete understanding of the material they are being tested on as well as control and maturity. A double promotion is not possible for a student of red belt (2nd Kup) because their instructor is not permitted to grade them for their black belt.

Belts
ETU uses the following system of belt gradings:

 10th Kup - White belt (white signifies innocence, as a student with no previous knowledge of Taekwondo)
 9th Kup - White belt with yellow tag
 8th Kup - Yellow belt (yellow signifies earth, from which the metaphorical plant sprouts forth and takes root as the foundations of Taekwondo are laid)
 7th Kup - Yellow belt with green tag
 6th Kup - Green belt (green signifies the plant's growth as skills are developed)
 5th Kup - Green belt with blue tag
 4th Kup - Blue belt (blue signifies heaven, towards which the plant is growing as training progresses)
 3rd Kup - Blue belt with red tag
 2nd Kup - Red belt (red signifies danger, cautioning the student to exercise control and warning opponents)
 1st Kup - Red belt with black tag
 1st Dan - Black belt (black is opposite to white and signifies maturity and proficiency in taekwondo)

References

External links
 

National members of World Taekwondo
Taekwondo